Edelf Ernesto Hossmann (29 August 1901 – 6 April 1989) was an Argentine sailor. He competed in the mixed 6 metres at the 1936 Summer Olympics.

References

External links
 

1901 births
1989 deaths
Olympic sailors of Argentina
Sailors at the 1936 Summer Olympics – 6 Metre
Argentine male sailors (sport)